Musey is a Chadic language of Chad and Cameroon. There is a degree of mutual intelligibility with Masana. Although Musey and Masa are mutually unintelligible, many Musey speakers also speak Masa.

Distribution
Musey is spoken east of Guéré, in the southern part of Mayo-Danay commune in Danay department, Far North Region, by 20,000 speakers in Cameroon. It is also spoken in Chad.

Phonology

Consonants

Vowels 

Lax allophones of /i u e o/ occur as [ɪ ʊ ɛ ɔ].

References

External links
Musey language materials from UCLA

Chadic languages
Languages of Chad